1338 Duponta, provisional designation , is a stony Florian asteroid and synchronous binary system from the inner regions of the asteroid belt, approximately 7.8 kilometers in diameter.

It was discovered on 4 December 1934, by French astronomer Louis Boyer at the Algiers Observatory in Algeria, North Africa. It was named after the discoverer's nephew, Marc Dupont. The asteroid's unnamed minor-planet moon was discovered in March 2007. It measures approximately 1.77 kilometers in diameter and has an orbital period of 17.57 hours.

Orbit and classification 

Duponta is a member of the Flora family, a giant asteroid family and the largest family of stony asteroids in the main belt. It orbits the Sun in the inner main belt at a distance of 2.0–2.5 AU once every 3 years and 5 months (1,245 days). Its orbit has an eccentricity of 0.11 and an inclination of 5° with respect to the ecliptic. The body's observation arc begins with its official discovery observation at Algiers in 1934.

Physical characteristics 

Duponta is an assumed stony S-type asteroid, which agrees with the Flora family's overall spectral type.

Rotation period 

In March 2007, a rotational lightcurve of Duponta was obtained from photometric observations by a collaboration of Czech (Ondřejov Observatory), Slovak (Modra Observatory), Australian and American astronomers. Lightcurve analysis gave a well-defined rotation period of 3.85453 hours with a brightness variation of 0.23 magnitude. Follow-up observations by Petr Pravec in 2007 and 2010, gave a concurring period of 3.85449 and 3.85453 hours with an amplitude of 0.26 and 0.23 magnitude, respectively.

Moon 

During the photometric observations in 2007, it was also revealed that Duponta is a synchronous binary asteroid with a minor-planet moon orbiting it every 17.57(8) hours. The minor planet moon has received the provisional designation . It has an estimated semi-major axis of 14 kilometers.

Diameter and albedo 

According to the survey carried out by the NEOWISE mission of NASA's Wide-field Infrared Survey Explorer, Duponta measures 7.470 and 7.875 kilometers in diameter and its surface has an albedo of 0.2286 and 0.251, respectively.

The Collaborative Asteroid Lightcurve Link adopts Petr Pravec's revised WISE data, that is, an albedo of 0.2159 and a diameter of 7.885 kilometers based on an absolute magnitude of 12.798.

Naming 

This minor planet was named by the discoverer after his nephew Marc Dupont. The official naming citation was mentioned in The Names of the Minor Planets by Paul Herget in 1955.

Notes

References

External links 
 Asteroids with Satellites, Robert Johnston, johnstonsarchive.net
 Satellites and Companions of Minor Planets, IAU – Central Bureau for Astronomical Telegrams, July 2010
 Asteroid Lightcurve Database (LCDB), query form (info )
 Dictionary of Minor Planet Names, Google books
 Asteroids and comets rotation curves, CdR – Observatoire de Genève, Raoul Behrend
 Discovery Circumstances: Numbered Minor Planets (1)-(5000) – Minor Planet Center
 
 

001338
Discoveries by Louis Boyer (astronomer)
Named minor planets
001338
19341204